Warren Memorial Presbyterian Church was a Presbyterian congregation formerly located in what is now downtown Louisville, Kentucky.

History
The church was incorporated under the name Chestnut Street Presbyterian Church on February 25, 1848.  In 1875, the church purchased land on the southwest corner of 4th and Broadway and began the construction of a new building.  The following year, the church's name was changed to Broadway Tabernacle Presbyterian Church.  The name was changed again to Warren Memorial Presbyterian Church in 1882.

Dr. A. B. Simpson pastored the church from 1874 to 1879.  He would later found the Christian and Missionary Alliance.

Pastors
 Leroy Jones Halsey (1849?–1858?)
 Dr. Gilbert H. Robertson (1870–1874)
 Dr. Albert Benjamin Simpson (1874–1879)

References

Churches in Louisville, Kentucky
Presbyterian churches in Kentucky
19th-century Presbyterian church buildings in the United States